A list of films produced in the Russian Empire between 1908 and 1917. For films 1917–1991 see List of Soviet films.

Before 1910

1910–1917

External links
 Movies from Imperial Russia online at Russian Film Hub
 Russian film at the Internet Movie Database

Empire